Babareshi is the name of a village, forest area, tourist and religious place in Jammu and Kashmir, India. It is named after the Sufi saint Baba Payam uddin Reshi.

It is located a few kilometres from Tangmarg and near the hill station Gulmarg.

Shrine
It is located near Ramboh village in Baramulla District. Built-in 1480, in Mughal and Persian style, the tomb is named after Baba Payam Uddin. The shrine and its surrounding garden is a tourist attraction as well as a destination for pilgrims visiting the shrine.

Roza Sharief Baba Payam Uddin
Baba Payam Uddin was a courtier of 15th century Kashmir King Zain-ul-Abidin, and he is said to have given up all his belongings in order to serve the common people. He lived and meditated at this location, which became the site of his tomb and a shrine for his disciples.

This shrine has a big minaret and inside the shrine is the Noor Khwan where the grave of the Sufi saint Lies. It is covered with cloth with Quran embroideries. The Noor Khwan is made of glass and wood carvings.

Urs
The Urs or the anniversary of Baba Payam ud din Reshi is celebrated annually and people from far off places visit the Shrine on the occasion.

Damage by fire
On 2 September 1989 the 300-year-old Baba Reshi shrine was gutted in a fire under mysterious circumstances.
The place known as daan that Baba Reshi built in the village Ramboh went ablaze and caused severe damage to several buildings surrounding the shrine causing a huge economic loss to the historic place.

Accommodations and travel
There are accommodations for tourists and pilgrims around the shrine. Each building has a Daan or cooking place where the Kashmiris prepare their meals and everyone traditionally contributes some of it to the Langar (collection Place). The Langar staff distribute the food in charity.

Transport

Air
The nearest airport from Babareshi is Srinagar International Airport which is at a distance of around 2 hours.

Road
The area is also connected by road via NH-1A from Narbal via Magam. It is linked with various towns such as Kunzer and Tangmarg by Gulmarg Highway.

Rail
The nearest railway station is the Mazhom railway station.

References

Villages in Baramulla district